Pedro Delgado Robledo (born 15 April 1960), also known as Perico, is a Spanish former professional road bicycle racer. He won the 1988 Tour de France, as well as the Vuelta a España in 1985 and 1989.

Delgado is 171 centimetres tall (5 ft 7-1/2 in) and used to weigh 64 kilograms (141 lb). He was a good climber, with an aggressive style, making cycling a spectacle, which gained him fans. On one hand, there were days when he was extremely successful attacking. On the other, he occasionally suffered from big losses of time due to mistakes or strokes of bad luck. He was also a good time-trialist until the nineties, when it became difficult for him to adapt to technical changes in the time-trial bicycles.

The ending of the 1987 Tour de France and the 1985 Vuelta a España and the whole 1989 Tour are among his more memorable participations in major competitions.

Delgado tested positive for the known masking agent Probenecid during the 1988 tour. The drug, which had been placed on the International Olympic Committee's list of banned substances in January of that year, was not banned by the sport's governing body, the Union Cycliste Internationale (it was a month later); as a consequence, Delgado was allowed to continue racing and was not charged with any doping offence.

Delgado was such a consistently strong rider that he finished in the top 10 of eighteen Grand Tours.

He works now as a sports commentator for Televisión Española during important cycling events.

Delgado inspired the name of the Scottish indie-rock band The Delgados.

Delgado and the Tour de France

Delgado took part in the Tour de France eleven times. During his first participation, when he was 23, he rose to second place in the overall classification after the 17th stage, before falling back later in the event. From then on, Delgado was determined to achieve victory in this competition.

In 1983, the Reynolds team participated in the Tour for the first time. Delgado was a young rider, and Ángel Arroyo was the star of the team. That year the Tour had four individual time trials (ITT), plus the prologue, and six mountainous stages, so Delgado had enough opportunities to show his talent. After the 17th stage Delgado was second in the overall classification, 1´08" behind Laurent Fignon, another 23-year-old rider competing in the Tour for the first time. Unfortunately, Delgado drank a spoilt milk shake that caused him a stomach cramp during the next stage, ending in Morzine. He lost 25 minutes 34 seconds that day, and his first chance of winning the Tour. Delgado ended that Tour in 15th position, 25 minutes 44 seconds behind Fignon.

It was not the only setback he had in this race. On the contrary, in different years he suffered the fracture of a clavicle, the death of his mother during a stage, the communication of a "positive" result in a dope test that finally proved false (but after it was filtered to the media), gastroenteritis, and a tremendous mistake that led him to lose seven minutes in the first two days of the tour of 1989.

1987 Tour de France
Delgado fought an epic battle with Stephen Roche during the 1987 Tour de France, that was resolved in favour of Roche only in the penultimate stage, an ITT. The final difference was 40 seconds, at the time the second smallest difference ever recorded. Delgado was the third best time-trialist that year, but Roche was clearly the best, and both knew that. Roche told a nice anecdote about it twenty years after:

"We were on French TV after the descent into Morzine [the last mountain stage, and Delgado was still leader of the overall classification] and, off camera, he came up to me, hugged me, and said 'Bravo, you deserve the yellow jersey'." The TV people couldn't believe it! He's a fabulous competitor, but he's also a great, incredibly gallant guy and I think that's another reason why that Tour was so special."

1988 Tour de France

Delgado won the 1988 Tour de France by a comfortable margin. However, it was suggested that the Tour was never easy for him. The evening after the 17th stage, the television channel "Antenne2" spread the news that Delgado had tested positive in a doping test. His team director José Miguel Echevarri was informed hours after by the Tour organization without mention of the substance. That night, Xavier Louy, director of the race, went to the hotel where Echavarri was and suggested to him that Delgado should withdraw. This was similar to the "Merckx affaire" in the 1969 Giro.

The following morning Echevarri received the official communication. The substance was probenecid, a medicine for the kidney and also a masking agent for anabolic steroids. In 1988, every sport had a different list of banned substances and the IOC had its own, although there was a commitment to unify the lists in 1990. Probenecid was in the IOC list, but not in the UCI list (it would be one month later) and rule number 35 of the 1988 Tour regulations stated that the doping test would be carried out in accordance with the UCI rules. The mistake of the laboratory seemed evident and the technical jury declared that Delgado had not broken any (UCI) rule.

However, the Director of the Tour de France, Jean-Pierre Courcol, said "I now know that the letter can replace the spirit of the law and that the regulations can be played with, in order to give the appearance of utter innocence. Today, I am ashamed" and his deputy, Jean-Marie Leblanc, described it as a "dismal verdict". Other riders were also unhappy, with Andy Hampsten stating "Delgado took a drug to mask steroids. It's not on the banned list but it's a masking drug and that's what the commissaries should have acknowledged. I think it's a crime to let him wear the yellow jersey, a crime against the public and against the sport."

In 1988 the sanction for this type of doping was a penalty of 10 minutes, which was applied to Gert-Jan Theunisse during the same 1988 Tour de France; Delgado, having been cleared, received no such penalty. Delgado's final advantage over the second rider in the overall classification, Steven Rooks, was 7:13 minutes. Third, 9:58 behind, was Fabio Parra.

Delgado wore the yellow jersey for eleven days, and passed doping tests every day. There was no trace of probenecid nor steroids in any other test. He thanked the public for their support and claimed he would always be grateful for the support he received during the competition.

Xavier Louy was replaced as Tour director months later.

1989 Tour de France

Delgado did not win the 1989 Tour de France, but it marked, perhaps, his most spectacular performance in the race. Showing up 2m 40s late for the prologue, Delgado covered the distance only 14 seconds slower than Erik Breukink, the stage winner. He became the only defending champion to begin the race in last place, 2:54 behind Breukink. As Delgado admitted later, that night he was very nervous and did not sleep. The following day there were two stages. Due to this he was very weak and suffered hypoglycemia in the second stage, a decisive team time-trial. That day he would have been dropped by his team had they not waited, and Delgado lost more time than in the previous stage, 4:32. After that second stage, Delgado was last in the overall classification, more than seven minutes behind the best-classified of the favourites, Laurent Fignon.

Delgado rode the rest of the race on the offensive. His reaction started in the 5th stage, a 73 km individual time-trial. He was second in the stage, 24 seconds behind an impressive Greg LeMond. In the first mountain stage, Delgado attacked during the last climb, gaining 29", but in the next stage Delgado, together with Robert Millar, finished 3:26 ahead of Fignon and 3:38 ahead of Lemond. Delgado was now 4th overall,  2:53 behind the leader, Fignon. After the 17th stage, finishing in Alpe d´Huez, final victory still seemed to be possible, Delgado was third overall, 1:55 behind Fignon and 1:29 behind Lemond. But Delgado, exhausted, was unable to make up all the time he had lost in the early stages, and the great final fight of that Tour had only two major figures: Laurent Fignon and the final winner, Greg LeMond.

Major results

1979
 1st Stage 11 Tour de l'Avenir
1980
 1st Stage 8 Giro Ciclistico d'Italia
 1st Stage 5 GP Tell
1981
 1st  Overall Vuelta a Murcia
1982
 1st Clásica de Sabiñánigo
 1st Stage 4a Vuelta a Cantabria
 3rd Clásica de San Sebastián
1983
 1st  Overall Vuelta a Aragón
1st Stage 3
 1st Stage 3a Vuelta a los Valles Mineros
 2nd Subida al Naranco
 4th Clásica de San Sebastián
 5th Overall Volta a Catalunya
1984
 4th Overall Vuelta a España
Held  after stages 7–11
 9th Overall Vuelta Ciclista al Pais Vasco
 9th Overall Vuelta a Aragón
1985
 1st  Overall Vuelta a España
1st Stage 6
 3rd Overall Vuelta a Murcia
 5th Overall Vuelta Ciclista al Pais Vasco
 6th Overall Tour de France
1st Stage 17
 9th Overall Volta a Catalunya
1986
 1st Stage 12 Tour de France
 2nd Subida al Naranco
 3rd Overall Escalada a Montjuïc
 6th Overall Tour de Suisse
 7th Overall Volta a Catalunya
 8th Overall Setmana Catalana de Ciclisme
 10th Overall Vuelta a España
1987
 2nd Overall Tour de France
1st Stage 19
Held  after stages 20–23
 4th Overall Vuelta a España
 7th Overall Volta a Catalunya
1988
 1st  Overall Tour de France
1st Stage 13 (ITT)
Held  after stages 12–22
 1st GP Miguel Induráin
 4th Overall Setmana Catalana de Ciclisme
 5th Trophée des Grimpeurs
 6th Overall Vuelta Ciclista al Pais Vasco
 6th Overall Tour de Romandie
 7th Overall Giro d'Italia
 8th La Flèche Wallonne
1989
 1st  Overall Vuelta a España
1st Stages 12, 15 (ITT) & 20 (ITT)
 2nd Overall Setmana Catalana de Ciclisme
 2nd Overall Volta a Catalunya
 3rd Overall Tour de France
 3rd Overall Escalada a Montjuïc
 3rd La Poly Normande
 4th Liège–Bastogne–Liège
1990
 1st Stage 2 Setmana Catalana de Ciclisme
 1st GP Miguel Induráin
 2nd Overall Vuelta a España
 3rd Overall Volta a Catalunya
 4th Overall Tour de France
 4th Subida al Naranco
1991
 1st  Overall Vuelta a Burgos
1st  Mountains classification 
1st Stage 4
 1st Subida a Urkiola
 1st Clásica a los Puertos
 2nd Overall Volta a Catalunya
 2nd Clásica de San Sebastián
 9th Overall Tour de France
 10th Overall Tour de Romandie
1992
 2nd Subida a Urkiola
 3rd Overall Vuelta a España
1st Stage 14
 5th La Flèche Wallonne
 6th Overall Tour de France
 8th Overall Setmana Catalana de Ciclisme
 10th Overall Volta a Catalunya
1993
 1st  Overall Setmana Catalana de Ciclisme
 2nd Klasika Primavera
 3rd Overall Vuelta Asturias
 6th Overall Vuelta a España
 9th OverallTour de France
1994
 2nd Overall Vuelta Asturias
 2nd Subida al Naranco
 3rd Overall Vuelta a España
 3rd Overall Volta a Catalunya
 5th Overall Escalada a Montjuïc
 7th Overall Vuelta a Murcia

Grand Tour general classification results timeline

References

Further reading

External links
Pedro Delgado's Official Website

Official Tour de France results for Pedro Delgado

1960 births
Living people
People from Segovia
Sportspeople from the Province of Segovia
Cyclists from Castile and León
Tour de France winners
Spanish Tour de France stage winners
Vuelta a España winners
Spanish Vuelta a España stage winners
Doping cases in cycling
Commentators
Cycling announcers
Spanish male cyclists